Jockey Club is a British horse-sports organisation.

Jockey Club also may refer to:

Sports organisations 

 Jockey Club, a British horse racing organisation
 Jockey Club (United States), an American Thoroughbred horse breed registry
 Jockey-Club de Paris, a French gentlemen's club and horse racing authority
 Maryland Jockey Club, an American horse racing organisation
 South Australian Jockey Club, an Australian horse racing organisation
 Australian Jockey Club, a former Australian horse racing organisation
 Jockey Club de Rosario, an Argentine sports and social club
 Jockey Club Córdoba, an Argentine sports and social club
 Jockey Club Brasileiro, a Brazilian horse racing organisation
 Jockey Club of Canada, a Canadian horse racing organisation
 Beijing Jockey Club, a former Chinese horse racing organisation
 Jockey Club of Turkey, a Turkish horse racing organisation
 Hong Kong Jockey Club, a Hong Kong horse racing organisation
 Hong Kong Jockey Club Champion Awards
 Macau Jockey Club, a Macanese horse racing organisation
 Jockey Club del Paraguay, a Paraguayan horse racing organisation
 Jockey Club del Perú, a Peruvian horse racing organisation
 Jockey Club Român, a Romanian sports club
 Manila Jockey Club, a Philippine horse racing organisation
 Picadero Jockey Club, a former Spanish sports club

Sports competitions 

 Jockey Club Stakes, a horse race in England.
 Jockey Club Rose Bowl, a horse race in England.
 Prix du Jockey Club, a horse race in France.
 Jockey Club Cup (Hong Kong), a horse race in Hong Kong.
 Jockey Club Mile, a horse race in Hong Kong.
 Jockey Club Sprint, a horse race in Hong Kong.
 Gran Premio del Jockey Club, a horse race in Italy.
 American Jockey Club Cup, a horse race in Japan.
 Jockey Club Gold Cup, a horse race in the United States.
 Kentucky Jockey Club Stakes, a horse race in the United States.
 Gran Premio Jockey Club, a horse race in Uruguay.
 Copa de Competencia Jockey Club, an Argentine football competition

Education 

 Jockey Club Ti-I College, a secondary school in Hong Kong.
 Jockey Club Government Secondary School, a secondary school in Hong Kong.
 Jockey Club Creative Arts Centre, an art colony in Hong Kong.
 Hong Kong Jockey Club College, an employee training institution in Hong Kong.

Other 

 Jockey Club, a jazz club in Atlantic City, United States
 Jockey Club, a condominium and timeshare building on the Las Vegas Strip
 The Jockey Club Live, a British music promoter
 Jockey Club Kau Sai Chau Public Golf Course, a golf course in Hong Kong
 Jockey Club, a club in Buenos Aires, Argentina